Anatoly Sheludyakov (born 1955) is a classical pianist and composer. He was born in Moscow, Russia, where he completed his doctoral studies under professor Anatoly Vedernikov at the Gnesin Institute of Music. He also graduated from the Moscow Conservatory where he studied composition with Tikhon Khrennikov. His works include Variations for Orchestra, Ostinato for Orchestra, String Trio, Five Intermezzi for Percussion, Suite for Violin and Piano, the cantata Brotherhood Songs, vocal cycles.

In 1977 Sheludyakov was the winner of the Russian National Piano Competition. He has performed solo concerts with orchestras, solo recitals, and chamber music performances in prestigious concert halls in Moscow, St. Petersburg, and other major cities in Russia, the U.S., Germany, France, Italy, China, Czechoslovakia, Yugoslavia, and Australia. He has recorded sixteen CDs of piano and chamber music and has performed on Russian television and radio. His repertoire includes many major works for solo piano, piano and orchestra, and piano chamber music of the Baroque, Classical, Romantic, and Contemporary periods.

Anatoly Sheludyakov has served as an assistant professor of piano at the Gnessin Institute of Music and has maintained a private piano studio in Moscow. Anatoly was awarded Honored Artist of Russian Federation in 1999 as well as the Medal of the Government of Moscow in 1997. He is currently an artist-in-residence at the University of Georgia, United States.

Source: adapted from artist's website

Discography 

Joaquin Turina” Complete Sonatas with Betul Soykan, Violin
A.Glazunov and V.Rebikov Piano works
Vladimir Rebikov Piano works
Gala-Concert February 3, 1997 (Live Recording)
Musique de Salon
Paul  Hindemith "Three Piano Sonatas"
Anton Arensky's Twenty Four Pieces. Live
Anton Arensky's Twenty Four Pieces
Stravinsky's Piano Works
Music of Russian Composers
Music of Stravinsky and Bartok
American Music for Tuba
Sonatas of Dmitry Shostakovich
Compositions of Tyzen Hsiao
Music of Dmitry Kabalevsky. Vol.10
Vyacheslav Artyomov's Ave
Mieczslaw Vainberg's Children Notebooks
Tso Chenguan's Chamber Works
Prokofiev, Schnittke, Khachaturian, Eshpai
Piotr Biely's Romances, Elegies

External links 
Official website of Anatoly Sheludyakov

Russian classical pianists
Male classical pianists
Russian composers
Russian male composers
People's Artists of Russia
University of Georgia people
1957 births
Living people
Moscow Conservatory alumni
21st-century classical pianists
21st-century Russian male musicians